is the main branch of Shorin-ryū style of Okinawan karate, started by Katsuya Miyahira, Hanshi 10th Dan.

It should not be confused with the newer Japanese Shidōkan (世界空手道連盟士道館 World Karate Association Shidōkan), which was founded by Yoshiji Soeno in 1981, another style of knockdown karate. Okinawan Shidokan (志道館) precedes Japanese Shidokan (士道館) by 33 years.

History

Origin of Shidō-kan 
In October 1948, Katsuya Miyahira opened his first karate dojo in Kanehisa, Nishihara, Okinawa, after receiving his Shihan (4th rank) Certificate from Chōshin Chibana. Miyahira received his 10th Dan in 1978. Miyahira chose to name his dojo Shidō-kan (志道館, "House of the Way of the Warrior"). "Shidō" was taken from the Analects by Confucius, chapter seven, verse six in book four of the twenty volume collection; which reads:

Determine in your heart to forever follow the way.
Stay close to the sun of virtue and do not stray.
Trust in the power of benevolence for support.
Take pleasure from these abilities.

Creation of Shorin-ryū Shidō-kan 
In Chosin Chibana's Shorin-ryu Karate 小林流 (also read as Kobayashi) five of his senior students were promoted to 9th Dan. Upon Chibana's death in 1969, Chibana's most senior student, Katsuya Miyahira, received the hanko (official seals of the organization) and was voted president of the Okinawa Shorin-ryū Karate-dō Association. Chibana's most senior students split the style of Shorin-ryū karate into various schools, Miyahira heading the main branch which is now called Shidō-kan (志道館) style, based upon the name of Miyahira's dojo. Shuguro Nakazato formed Shorinkan, Yuchoku Higa formed Kyudokan, Chozo Nakama, and Kensei Kinjo formed Kushin-ryu.

Shidokan characteristics 
Shidokan, like most Chibana-ha or Kobayashi schools, is generally characterized by relatively high stances (typical of self defense karate), quick and light movements, and explosive power.

Shidokan dojo guidelines 
Miyahira Shidokan dojo's guidelines:

Try to perfect one's own personality 
Cultivate the spirit of making constant efforts 
Admonish one's own youthful ardor 
Value good manners

Thoughts on Kata 

Kata is never concrete in performance or interpretation. It changes either knowingly, unknowingly or through the passage of time. Sometimes the changes are small—like changing the emphasis of punching to kicking or to quick movements or to slow, steady movements. An instructor may favor one technique over another and tell his students to emphasize it more than it was originally taught. The kata is still the same but a change has now taken place either consciously or unconsciously. These minor changes have not really changed the style. These changes cannot be prevented either, for in most cases the change occurs over a long period of time.

Patience 
Posted on the Wall in the Shidokan Dojo:
To Have Patience Where it is Possible 
Is Not Real Patience 
Yet to Have Patience Where It Is Impossible 
Is Real Patience!

Shidokan maxims posted in dojo 
Proper Spirit:
You should thoroughly understand and pay strict attention to your teacher's corrections and apply them correctly. 
You can attain perfection by exercising patience and through constant training. 
In learning the basic techniques, learn to apply them, adopt them and finally transform them to your own taste but always according to the correct theory of basic techniques. 
You should listen to and accept the corrections of the more senior or advanced students. 
Try to assimilate everything good in your peers and use it to correct that which is inconsistent in you. 
When teaching you should always be kind but firm and strict with your juniors. 

Conduct:
To acquire experience and understanding, take seriously all advice given to you.
Never judge or take a person lightly. 
Accept with an open mind the opinions and remarks of others, if they prove to be earnest, just and correct. 
Be honest, fair and true whenever you ponder over or reason out a problem or theory. 
When you are not training, quietly sit by the edge of the dojo and watch the activities of your fellow students and how they are corrected.

Shidōkan in Okinawa today 
Today, Shidō-kan is one of the largest styles of karate in Okinawa, with over 25 dojo in the prefecture. Within Okinawa, Shidō-kan is well known for its success in the Okinawan Bare Knuckle karate tournaments, largely due to Koichi Nakasone.
Okinawa, Seiyu Nakamura, Hansei 10th Dan, and a student of Miyahira's, has a dojo in Yaese-cho Okinawa, Japan where he currently resides.

Maeshiro Morinobu Hanshi 10th Dan. Vice president of OSKK, and Naha city karate federation chairman, teaches in the Shidokan Hombu dojo and in his dojo in Naha.

International Shidokan 

Argentina: Shoei Miyazato moved to Argentina in 1959. Miyazato began teaching Shidō-kan in his new hometown, Cordoba. In the early 1990s, Miyazato left Shidō-kan to head his own style of karate but a few years later rejoined Miyahira's Shidokan Organization. Masatoshi Miyazato, 10th Dan, Shoei Miyazato's son, heads up the Miyazato Dojo and organization. They have over 90 affiliated dojos throughout Latina America and Europe and between 9,000 to 10,000 active students. They celebrated their 60th anniversary in November 2019.

In 1996, Shidō-kan was reestablished by Jorge Garzón, 8th Dan, Shorin Ryu Shidokan in Argentina who has a dojo in La Plata Hombu Dojo Shido Kan Argentina, dojos in  Buenos Aires, La Pampa Cordoba, and 25 affiliated dojos in Argentina. Garzón is a student of Takeshi Miyagi, a 9th Dan and former student of Miyazato who previously lived in Argentina, but currently resides and has a dojo in Tokyo.

Australia: Shidō-kan Australia is headed by Alberto Presincula, 9th Dan. He has a dojo in Albion, Victoria and he is also a representative of Okinawa Shorin ryu Karate-do Kyokai in Australia appointed by the President of The Association, Takeshi Miyage. He was a student of Iha from the 1960s until 2012. He was also under Latino H. Gonzalez, 9th Dan (Father of Philippine Karate). He had taught many U.S. Navy and U.S. Marine Corps members at Subic Bay Naval Base and San Miguel Naval Communication Base, Philippines. He promoted many in Dan rank from his Dojo (United Karatedo Association) during his time in the Philippines, one notable student in 1979 promoted to 3rd Dan was Cris A. Bato, a former U.S. Marine Sergeant and Close Combat Instructor.

Brazil: In August 1990, Kazunori Yonamine began teaching Shidō-kan in the city of São Vicente, Brazil. In subsequent years, Yonamine's students spread Shidō-kan throughout Brazil to the cities of Piracicaba, São Paulo, Santos and Itajubá. Today there are up to 17 Shidō-kan dojos across these towns. Yonamine died on 22 October 2015 as 9th Dan.

In Brasilia, Sensei Herbert "Dada" Inocalla, a 3rd Dan Black Belt under Filipino movie actor Rolando Gonzalez, 7th Dan, son of Latino H. Gonzalez, 9th Dan, continues to teach Shorin-Ryu Karate in his Academia Magka-Isa.

Canada: Roy Paul, 7th Dan, is the head of Shidō-kan in Canada. He is a student of Iha and has a dojo in Guelph, Ontario. Shidō-kan Canada celebrated its 20th anniversary in 2016. There are also dojos in Waterloo, Ontario, and Trois Rivieres, Quebec.

Czech Republic: Shidō-kan in Czech Republic is led by Petr Zazvorka 5th Dan. He is in charge of Shidō-kan dojo Liberec.

France: Shidō-kan in France is headed by Dikran Kevork, 9th Dan, Kyoshi. He began teaching Shidō-kan in Marseilles in September 1988.

Germany: Shidō-kan Germany is headed by Joachim Laupp, Hanshi 9th Dan, who teaches in Düsseldorf and Trier. His students have Dojos in Marburg, Saarburg, Chemnitz, Dernbach and Berlin.

Greece: Vasillios Raptopoulos, a student of Joachim Laupp opened up a Dojo in Athens in 2009.

Guam: in 1969, Iha and Seigi Shiroma traveled to Guam. Shiroma stayed there and opened a dojo. Shiroma is currently ranked Hanshi, 10th Dan and continues to teach.

Israel: Amit Michaeli, 6th Dan, has a dojo in Jerusalem. He is a student of Paul Snader, 8th Dan, who trains in New Jersey under Iha.

Italy: Emanuel Giordano, 4th Dan, teaches in Torino; he is a student of Maeshiro Morinobu.
Josè Speranza, 7th Dan, teaches in Cisterna di Latina. He was a student of Sensei Shoei Miyazato.
Miguel Carballo, 5th Dan, teaches in Firenze, Loppiano. He was Student of Luzuriaga Carlos and Sensei Shoei Miyazato.

Netherlands: a atudent of Joachim Laupp opened up a Dojo in Enschede in 2016.

Philippines: in 1963, Miyahira received a request to supply a Shorin-ryū instructor to the Philippines from Latino Gonzalez. Seikichi Iha, a student of Miyahira's, was selected and spent 11 months in Manila at the dojo of Latino Gonzalez.

Russia: Dmitry Uritsky, 2nd Dan, has a dojo in Moscow. He is also a student of Snader.

Switzerland: students of Joachim Laupp run Dojos in Zürich and Luzern.

United States: Seikichi Iha is the senior-most practitioner of Okinawa Shorin-ryu residing in the United States and is ranked a Hanshi 10th Dan by the Okinawa Shorin-ryu Karate-do Association of Naha, Okinawa. He was promoted to 10th Dan March 25, 2001. He was Miyahira's senior student and the rank/leader board in Miyahira's Dojo still lists Iha's name right next to Miyahira's testifying to that. Before coming to Michigan, Iha Sensei trained students in Okinawa, Japan, the Philippines, Guam, and Los Angeles, California. His Lansing dojo is now the headquarters of the Beikoku Shidokan Association for more than 30 North American schools and is frequently visited by karate practitioners from around the globe. Iha was introduced to Miyahira by Shoei Miyazato and began studying with Miyahira when his first instructor, Shinpan (Shiromoa) Gusukuma, died. In 1967, Iha went to Los Angeles, California to teach at the American-Okinawan Club. After 7 months, Iha opened the Shureikan Dojo on Olympic Blvd with two other 7th Dan black belts. A year later, Iha started his own dojo on West Pico Blvd and named it Shidokan Karate Dojo. Iha moved to Lansing, Michigan in April 1975, and began teaching at the Original Okinawa Karate Dojo. Iha is currently ranked Hanshi, 10th Dan and continues to teach.

Shidō-kan today 
Today, Shidō-kan is one of the largest styles of karate in Okinawa, with over 25 dojo in the prefecture. Within Okinawa, Shidō-kan is well known for its success in the Okinawan Bare Knuckle karate tournaments, largely due to Koichi Nakasone.

Basic techniques

Punches and strikes 
 High punch - jodan zuki
 Middle punch - chudan zuki
 Knife hand strike - shuto uchi

Kicks 
 Front snap kick - mae geri
 Side kick - yoko geri
 Roundhouse kick - mawashi geri
 Back thrust kick - ushiro geri
 Stomping kick - fumikomi geri
 Inside Stomp Kick - kin geri

Blocks 
 High block - jodan uke
 Outside block - soto uke
 Inside block - uchi uke
 Low block - gedan barai
 Hooking hand block - kagite uke
 Swimming or flowing block - nagashi uke

Stances 
 Attention stance - musubi dachi
 Natural stance - shizentai dachi
 Basic stance - kihon dachi
 Back stance - ukiashi dachi
 Straddle stance - shiko dachi
 Forward stance - zenkutsu dachi
 Horse stance - kiba dachi
 Layout back stance - kokutsu dachi
 Cat stance - neko ashi dachi
 Cross leg stance - kosa dachi

Kata 

The kata practiced in Shidō-kan varies by dojo. The following series of kata are common to all: Kihon, Naihanchi, Pinan, Passai, Kusanku, Chinto, Gojushiho, and Tetsu Shou (created by Miyahira). Additionally, some schools practice Jion and Koryu Passai (Old Style Passai).

See also 
 Makiwara
 Hojo undō

References

External links 
 Examples of Kata and other Belt requirements
 Article from Fair Lawn, NJ's Shido-kan Dojo about Okinawan Karate-do

Shidokan